"The Monkeys Thought 'Twas All in Fun" is a short story by Orson Scott Card. It appears in his short story collections Unaccompanied Sonata and Other Stories and Maps in a Mirror.

Plot summary
A story about how paradise can have its hidden pitfalls.

See also

List of works by Orson Scott Card
Orson Scott Card

References

External links
 
 The official Orson Scott Card website

Short stories by Orson Scott Card
1980 short stories